The Green Building is an environmentally conscious mixed-use development situated in Manchester. The Green Building was designed by Farrells, who aimed to create a sustainable environment on an unusual triangular plot, adjacent to Oxford Road station. The building was constructed by Taylor Woodrow as part of the Macintosh Village development, which was formerly a Dunlop tyre factory and also the birthplace of the Mackintosh raincoat.

A total of 32 apartments are arranged across the uppermost eight stories of the ten-floor development. The lower two levels contain a children's day nursery, operated by Bright Horizons, and a commercial unit earmarked as a doctor's surgery (currently vacant).

Key features 
 Energy-efficient thermal design encompassing renewable insulation.
 Solar thermal water heating system providing hot water for domestic plumbing and underfloor heating.
 Large full-height triple-glazed windows on the south-facing side maximise solar gain. The north-facing apartments have relatively small windows.
 An internal central atrium interlinked with all apartments provides a passive air conditioning system. Warm air from each apartment passes into the central atrium and rises, drawing fresh cooler air into the apartments. Computer-controlled windows at the top of the atrium regulate air-flow.
 Building electrical requirements are supplemented by a 2.5 kW push-type wind power turbine.
 The cylindrical shape of the tower provides the least surface area related to the volume, further increasing thermal efficiency.
 Integrated recycling facilities for glass, paper and aluminium. A communal composting bin is currently being proposed by the residents association.
 All apartments only have showers in the bathrooms; there are no baths in the residential apartments. The taps are designed to use the minimum amount of water necessary to wash hands safely.

Performance 
There are no performance figures currently available for the building. The Green Building Residents Association (GBRA) are pursuing the management company for official figures of electricity and fuel savings provided by the sustainable systems integrated into the building.

Awards 
In 2006, the architects Farrells were awarded a Sustainable Civic Trust Award for the Green Building development.

Transport 
Due to the city centre location of the Green Building, public transport links are in abundance. Because of the excellent transportation links, no car parking spaces were provided as part of the development. Instead, bicycle parking bays were supplied with both internal and external parking facilities available.

The Green Building is located on New Wakefield Street adjacent to Oxford Road station, providing direct rail links to Manchester Airport, Liverpool, Wales, the Lake District, the Peak District and the Midlands. The nearby (five minute walk - more like 10 to 15 minutes) Manchester Piccadilly Rail Terminus provides direct links to London, the rest of England and Scotland.

There are two Metrolink tram stops close to the Green Building. Deansgate-Castlefield and St Peter's Square are nearby, both on most Metrolink lines.

The site the Green Building resides on has two public thoroughfares either side of the development, both pedestrianised. The main road for vehicle access is Great Marlborough Street, which has pay and display on-street parking for up to three hours.

Macintosh Village is connected to the Manchester Inner Ring Road via the A57(M) flyover that passes 300 metres to the south of the Green Building, which provides access to the national motorway network.

Oxford Road, claimed by some analysts to be part of the busiest bus corridor in Europe, is 75 metres east of the Green Building, and provides bus links to the University of Manchester, Chorlton, Longsight, Piccadilly Gardens, Manchester Airport, The Trafford Centre and many other locations across the south of Greater Manchester.

See also 
 Energy efficiency in British housing
 BedZED development

References

External links 

 The Macintosh Village development
 Terry Farrell Associates
 The Civic Trust

Residential buildings completed in 2004
Apartment buildings in England
Residential buildings in Manchester
Low-energy building in the United Kingdom